Naresh Chandra Chaturvedi (born 30 April 1928) is a writer and poet, predominantly writing in Hindi language. He was born in Farrukhabad, Uttar Pradesh. He completed his M. A. in Hindi from the Jabalpur University.

Chaturvedi was the member of Indian National Congress, and was elected to the 8th Lok Sabha from the Kanpur constituency. He was the general secretary of All India Congress Committee. In 1999, he was the member of National Commission for SC and ST.

References

1928 births
Possibly living people
Indian National Congress politicians
People from Farrukhabad
India MPs 1984–1989
Hindi-language writers
Lok Sabha members from Uttar Pradesh
Politicians from Kanpur
Indian National Congress politicians from Uttar Pradesh